Taxicabs of the Philippines are one of the modes of transportation in the country. They are regulated by the Department of Transportation (DOTr), the Land Transportation Office (LTO), and the Land Transportation Franchising and Regulatory Board (LTFRB). The taxicabs there vary from models and uses. Most taxicabs have yellow colored license plates, taxi signs, LTFRB Registration number, and taximeter, which is mandatory in every cab.

Regulation
Taxis during the 1990s did not have a color-coding system but in 2001, LTFRB mandated that all taxicabs should be white. Some taxicab companies, however, still use their own colors to distinguish their units while keeping the roof and pillars white. Airport taxis, on the other hand, are yellow. A taxicab has a maximum operational lifespan of 10 years before being pulled out of service.

Each taxicab has its license plate number printed on both quarter panels. The rear of the car has the telephone numbers of the taxicab company and the LTFRB printed to report any reckless driving.

Availability
Most of Metropolitan Areas in the Philippines have taxicabs to serve. The franchises of taxicabs are under the policy of LTFRB and Local Government units around the country. Here is the list of areas where taxicabs are available:

 Luzon
 Metro Manila
 Yellow Taxicabs - from airport to any part of Luzon
 White Taxicabs - any part of Metro Manila and neighbor Provinces
 Baguio
 Laoag, Ilocos Norte
 Vigan, Ilocos Sur
 San Fernando, La Union
 Dagupan, Pangasinan
 Tuguegarao, Cagayan
 Clark Freeport Zone
 Subic Bay Freeport Zone
 City of Naga, Camarines Sur (in the Bicol Region)
 Legazpi City, Albay
 Puerto Princesa, Palawan
 Lucena City, Quezon
 Visayas
 Tacloban, Leyte
 Ormoc City
 Cebu City
 Bohol 
 Iloilo City
 Mindanao
 Butuan
 Cagayan de Oro
 Davao City
 Zamboanga City

See also
 Automotive industry in the Philippines
 Transportation in the Philippines
 List of bus companies of the Philippines

References

Public transportation in the Philippines
Road transportation in the Philippines
Philippines
Transportation in Metro Manila